Jonathan Mannion (born December 3, 1970) is a photographer and film director. Mannion has shot over 300 album covers working with hip hop and R&B performers including Jay Z, Dr. Dre, Aaliyah, Outkast, Nas, Nicki Minaj, Brandy Norwood and Kendrick Lamar. He was the photographer behind the Beats by Dre "Straight Outta" campaign.

Early life and education
With English and American ancestry, he was raised in Cleveland, Ohio.  His father and mother are both Midwest artists. His mother is from London and his father from Brooklyn. Mannion studied at Kenyon College in Ohio graduating with honors. In 1996 he moved from Cleveland to New York City.

Career

New York and Richard Avedon
Mannion worked for a year with photographer Richard Avedon in his Manhattan studio. Mannion also worked with photographers Ben Watts, Steven Klein, and Marc Hom.

Jay-Z and hip hop
In 1996, Mannion was commissioned to take photos of Brooklyn rapper Jay-Z for Reasonable Doubt.

Lawsuit
In Mannion versus Coors Brewing Company Mannion successfully sued Coors for their unlicensed use of his photograph in one of their advertisements.

Album credits

References

External links
Mannion's site
MTV News Segment, June 2008
http://www.dotspotter.com/news/788761_Aaliyah_In_a_Jonathan_Mannion_PhotoShoot
http://www.brightcove.tv/title.jsp?title=1299131135&channel=196565916
http://www.rebrand.com/page372.html
https://web.archive.org/web/20101120021434/http://www.videostatic.com/vs/sugar_management/index.html
http://www.washingtonpost.com/ac2/wp-dyn?node=cityguide/profile&id=1138575&categories=Exhibits&venueid=791999
http://www.hiphopdx.com/index/lifestyle-features/id.1085/title.jonathan-mannion-desire/p.2
http://www.freshnessmag.com/v4/2006/06/26/jonathan-mannion-222-gallery-la/

American music video directors
American photographers
Living people
Kenyon College alumni
1970 births
People from Cleveland